EUMS may mean:

 European Union Member States
 European Union Military Staff
 Edinburgh University Music Society
 European Union of Medical Specialists